The Secret of My Success (also known as The Secret of My Success or: How Three Beautiful Girls Love for Fun—and Murder for Profit) is a 1965 British comedy film from American writer-director Andrew L. Stone, starring James Booth, Shirley Jones, Stella Stevens and Honor Blackman, along with Lionel Jeffries featured in four separate roles.

Plot
Thanks to his mother's help, Arthur Tate somehow makes a remarkable rise from a lowly constable to the ruler of a South America country.

His story begins with Inspector Hobart's investigation into dressmaker Violet Lawson's missing husband. Hobart suspects foul play and digs up Violet's cellar, looking for the body. Violet did indeed kill her spouse, but doesn't bury the corpse there until after Hobart has dug the hole. A helpful tip from Arthur's mum makes him the hero who solves the case.

Baron von Lukenberg is then arrested for creating a species of deadly spiders. But it is actually his wife, the Baroness, who is responsible. Arthur, with his mum's aid, once again saves the day. President Esteda of the South American nation of Guanduria is so favorably impressed, he hires Arthur to be his personal liaison.

Marigold Marado turns up, telling Arthur she wants to make a film about his heroism. What he doesn't know is that Marigold is a revolutionary who hopes to overthrow Esteda's government. The film she ends up creating inadvertently turns Arthur into a great revolutionary hero, and it is he who becomes Guanduria's new leader.

Arthur can do no wrong. The Earl of Aldershot learns of his great deeds and leaves Arthur the grand sum of 15 million pounds in his will. Arthur goes back to England to the Earl's mansion to collect, intending to give all the money away to charity, but leaving it to his mother in case of his death. She blows up the mansion with her son in it.

Cast

Critical reception
The New York Times described the film as a "lengthy, busy but largely unfunny mélange of comedy and melodrama." Sky Movies wrote that the film was a "pleasing comedy", and noted, "Lionel Jeffries does a mini-Alec Guinness by playing four parts."

References

External links 
 
 
 

1965 films
1960s black comedy films
British black comedy films
Films directed by Andrew L. Stone
Metro-Goldwyn-Mayer films
1965 comedy films
1965 drama films
Films shot at MGM-British Studios
1960s English-language films
1960s British films